The Museum of Radio and Technology is a museum in Huntington, West Virginia. 

The museum covers the birth and growth of electronic communication and entertainment, and includes hands-on exhibits. Admission is free.

Features

 1920s-1930s radio shop: The tour begins with mechanical music reproduction in the pre-electrical era. Learn how wireless communication began, with a working "crystal radio" and a rotary spark gap demonstrator.
 1940s-1950s show room: Visit a typical radio and television store showroom of the era. There are tube and transistor radios, television sets, wire and tape recorders, and vintage turntables and tuners.  A comprehensive display of 1950s toys from the A.C. Gilbert Company includes Erector sets, chemistry sets, microscopes and the Gilbert Atomic Energy Lab.
 Computer display: A "time line" of desktop computers from the IMSAI to the Mac and Lisa. See a 7-megabyte hard drive that's as big as a suitcase.
 Gift shop: Clothing, toys, books and magazines, antique and reproduction radios, even some floor-model wind-up Victrola phonographs for sale, with records.
 Ham and short wave radios: Short-wave receivers and transmitters as used by "hams" and hobbyists.  The "Big H's": Hallicrafters, Hammarlund, Heath and National (OK, that's an N, but it looks like an H.)
 Military communication display: Contains various military radio and communication gear.
 Modern ham radios: Amateur radio station WV8MRT may be operated by any licensed visitor.
 Radio classroom: Facilities for teaching about electronics, including test equipment and illustrative circuit demonstrators.
 Harveytown School: Meet the children who sat in classes when our building was an elementary school, from the 1920s to the 1970s.
 Radio DJ studio: A working broadcast studio as used by platter-spinning disc jockeys from the early 1950s to the late 1990s.  Sit down at the console and see how it feels. 
 Broadcasting room: Radio and TV broadcast equipment including a massive 5000-watt AM transmitter from the 1930s.  Recorders, cameras, control boards and those famous "N-B-C" chimes.
 West Virginia Broadcasting Hall of Fame: Honoring West Virginians who have figured in the history of broadcasting.
 The Library: Books, magazines and other publications about radio and electronics.  We have a near-complete collection of the famous H.W. Sams and Ryder service manuals for the use of our Members.
 The Auditorium and Stage: Auction sales and Swap Meets are held here three times per year.  Our stage presents the annual Hall of Fame ceremony as well as Radio Dinner Theater.  These facilities and the adjacent kitchen are available for private event rentals.

The Museum is located at 1640 Florence Avenue in the Harveytown area of Huntington, West Virginia. It is one of the largest of its kind in the eastern United States, with over 10,000 square feet of space.

West Virginia Broadcasting Hall of Fame

One major section of the Museum of Radio and Technology is dedicated to the West Virginia Broadcasting Hall of Fame.  West Virginia boasts a large number of persons who were instrumental in the initial days of broadcasting history.  Pictures, a story book, and a wall of names provide an interesting area of the West Virginia Radio and Technology Museum for visitors.

See also
American Museum of Radio and Electricity
Museum of Broadcast Communications
20th Century Technology Museum
National Radio Hall of Fame
Military Wireless Museum in the Midlands

References

External links
Museum of Radio and Technology official website

History of radio
Science museums in West Virginia
Industry museums in West Virginia
Museums in Cabell County, West Virginia
Buildings and structures in Huntington, West Virginia
Telecommunications museums in the United States